Schoolhouse Lake is an all-sports 37-acre lake located in central Oakland County, on the east side of Waterford in Waterford Township.

The lake is part of the Clinton River watershed.

The Clinton River enters Schoolhouse Lake on the north end and exits on the west end. Upstream is Lake Oakland and Wormer Lake (27.5 acres).
Downstream from Schoolhouse Lake is Loon Lake.

History
The village of Clintonville was first settled in 1830 near what was later named Schoolhouse Lake.

The Schoolhouse Lake was so named when Clintonville School No.7, the first school in Clintonville, was built on the banks of the lake at what today is 3101 Walton Boulevard in Waterford, Michigan near Clintonville Road. The school building still stands today.

Fish
Schoolhouse Lake contains a variety of fish, including black crappie, bluegill, largemouth bass, northern pike, rock bass, smallmouth bass, sunfish, walleye and yellow perch.

References

Lakes of Oakland County, Michigan
Lakes of Michigan
Lakes of Waterford Township, Michigan